Marcos Aoás Corrêa (born 14 May 1994), known as Marquinhos, is a Brazilian professional footballer who plays as a defender for Ligue 1 club Paris Saint-Germain, which he captains, and the Brazil national team. Mainly a centre-back, he can also play as a right-back or a defensive midfielder.  Marquinhos is widely regarded as one of the best defenders in the world.

He began his career at Corinthians, and after winning the 2012 Copa Libertadores he moved to Roma for an eventual fee of €3 million. Marquinhos was a regular in his only season as Roma reached the Coppa Italia Final. In July 2013, he moved to Paris Saint-Germain for €31.4 million on a five-year contract, one of the highest fees for a player under the age of 20. Marquinhos played less frequently after the acquisition of compatriot David Luiz in 2014, returning to an integral role after the latter was sold in 2016. Marquinhos was part of PSG's team that reached the 2020 UEFA Champions League Final. After Thiago Silva's departure in August 2020, Marquinhos took up the role of captain. His trophy cabinet with PSG includes seven Ligue 1 titles and twelve domestic cups, and he ranks third for all-time appearances for the club.

Marquinhos made his full international debut for Brazil in 2013, and was part of their under-21 side which won the 2014 Toulon Tournament. He also represented the nation at the 2015 Copa América and the following year's Copa América Centenario, and won a gold medal at the 2016 Olympics. He subsequently took part at the 2018 FIFA World Cup, the 2019 Copa América, the 2021 Copa América and the 2022 World Cup, winning the 2019 title.

Club career

Corinthians
Marquinhos joined Corinthians at the age of eight in 2002. After winning the state junior cup, he was first included in a senior matchday squad on 29 January 2012, remaining an unused substitute in their 1–0 home win over Linense in the Campeonato Paulista. He made his professional debut in the competition on 18 February, playing the full 90 minutes of a victory by the same score at São Caetano. He made eight appearances across the season, as the Timão topped the table in the regular season but were defeated by Ponte Preta in the play-offs quarter-finals.

After the conclusion of the state championship, Marquinhos made his Campeonato Brasileiro Série A debut on 20 May 2012, playing the full 90 minutes in a 0–1 loss to Fluminense at the Paulo Machado de Carvalho Stadium; both teams were resting players in the first game of the season due to concentration on the Copa Libertadores. He played six games in the national championship, and was an unused substitute as the club won the 2012 Copa Libertadores Finals against Boca Juniors.

Roma
In July 2012, Marquinhos was signed by Italian club Roma from Corinthians. The transfer was initially a one-year loan for a fee of €1.5 million, rising to €3 million after he made eight first-team appearances of at least 45 minutes each. At Roma, he played under the name "Marcos" printed on his jersey to avoid confusion with teammate Marquinho.

Marquinhos made his debut on 16 September in a 2–3 loss against Bologna at the Stadio Olimpico, sent on by manager Zdeněk Zeman to replace Iván Piris for the match's final 15 minutes. By October, Zeman decided to partner Marquinhos for his speed alongside former Corinthians teammate and fellow Brazilian Leandro Castán in central defence, demoting former starter Nicolás Burdisso to the substitutes' bench. He given a straight red card in a 4–2 victory over Milan on 22 December when he was judged to have denied Stephan El Shaarawy a clear goalscoring opportunity.

Marquinhos played 26 Serie A games in his only season, and four in the Coppa Italia. This included the full 90 minutes of the final on 26 May, playing at right back as Roma lost 0–1 to Rome rivals Lazio.

Paris Saint-Germain

2013–14: Transfer and debut season 
On 19 July 2013, Marquinhos signed a five-year deal with French side Paris Saint-Germain for a fee of €31.4 million. According to BBC Sport, this was then the highest transfer fee for a teenager, although Sky Sports report it as then the fifth-highest such transfer, and France's Le 10 Sport record it as the third-highest. French news channel BFM TV described the transfer as the fifth most expensive of all time for a defender, after those of Rio Ferdinand, Thiago Silva, Lilian Thuram and Dani Alves. Marquinhos' transfer was threatened by anomalies in his medical exam, and he missed the team's pre-season visit to Sweden. His mother said that he had caught a virus, with PSG denying claims circulated by Le Parisien that he had hepatitis.
On his official debut for the club on 17 September, Marquinhos scored his first professional goal to confirm a 4–1 win against Olympiacos at the Karaiskakis Stadium in the group stage of the 2013–14 UEFA Champions League. Five days later, Marquinhos made his Ligue 1 debut as a starter in a 1–1 draw against Monaco. His first league goal for the club came on 28 September, the first in a 2–0 win over Toulouse. On 2 October, he scored the second goal in a 3–0 Champions League group victory against Benfica. Marquinhos, who was playing due to injury to Thiago Silva, expressed surprise at his goalscoring form at the start of his PSG career. Marquinhos scored the last goal of PSG's 6–1 aggregate win over Bayer Leverkusen in the last 16 of the Champions League on 12 March 2014, and was an unused substitute as they won the Coupe de la Ligue final against Lyon on 19 April. On 10 May, he scored the opening goal of a 3–1 win over Lille, which put by-then league champions PSG to a record league points tally of 86 with a game left to play.

2014–15: First domestic treble 
Marquinhos began the 2014–15 season on 2 August in the Trophée des Champions, playing the whole 90 minutes as PSG won 2–0 against Guingamp at the Workers Stadium in Beijing. In the 32nd minute, he gave away a penalty kick by fouling Claudio Beauvue, but Salvatore Sirigu saved the penalty shot from Mustapha Yatabaré. His first goal of the season came in a 2–0 win at Caen on 24 September, heading in Javier Pastore's corner. On 26 March 2015, Marquinhos signed a one-year contract extension to keep him at the team until 2019. Club president Nasser Al-Khelaifi said that, "The biggest European clubs were interested in signing Marquinhos, so this contract extension further reinforces Paris Saint-Germain's ambitious long-term project." As the right-back in an all-Brazilian defence (alongside Maxwell, Thiago Silva and David Luiz), Marquinhos featured in PSG's 3–2 win at Marseille in Le Classique, scoring the equaliser. Six days later, he started in the 4–0 victory over Bastia in the 2015 Coupe de la Ligue, his 34th consecutive game without a defeat for the club, surpassing a record set by George Weah. On 16 May, PSG won their third consecutive league title with a 2–1 victory at Montpellier, with Marquinhos playing the final 12 minutes in place of Yohan Cabaye. Two weeks later, he was an unused substitute as the team finished a perfect domestic season with victory in the Coupe de France final against Auxerre.

2015–16: Transfer drama and cup finals 

PSG began the 2015–16 season with a 2–0 victory over Lyon in the 2015 Trophée des Champions, with Marquinhos an unused substitute as Serge Aurier played at right back. At the end of the summer transfer window, Chelsea had two bids rejected for his signature, of amounts between £25.7–£40.4 million. Marquinhos rarely started during the season, due to the partnership of his compatriots Silva and David Luiz in the centre of the PSG defence. One of the team's former defenders, Alex, recommended that Marquinhos leave the team, as he was in demand from big teams in which he would have an opportunity to play. In February 2016, Silva criticised the agency representing Marquinhos and David Luiz for having led two players of the same position to the same club, thus limiting Marquinhos' opportunities; Silva mentioned Barcelona's interest in the player. PSG manager Laurent Blanc stated that he would be open for Marquinhos to leave at the end of the season, while agent Giuliano Bertolucci confirmed that Marquinhos would be leaving.

On 2 March, Marquinhos scored his first goal of the season as PSG won 3–1 at Saint-Étienne in the cup quarter-finals. On 23 April, he played the entirety of a 2–1 win over Lille in the 2016 Coupe de la Ligue Final, and he did so again on 21 May in the Coupe de France final, a 4–2 win over Marseille, as PSG won all four domestic trophies for the second consecutive season.

2016–17: Le Classique goal and contract negotiations 
Marquinhos missed PSG's victory in the 2016 Trophée des Champions in August due to his selection in the Brazil team at the Olympics. He was tipped by ESPN journalist Jonathan Johnson to play more frequently over the season, as new manager Unai Emery sold David Luiz back to Chelsea. He scored his first goal of the season on 26 February 2017, opening a 5–1 win at rivals Marseille; prior to the game he confirmed that he was in talks for a new contract at the club. On 26 April, he scored the last goal of a 5–0 home win over title rivals Monaco in the Coupe de France semi-finals, and he started beside Silva in a 1–0 win over Angers a month later in the final. Marquinhos said on 14 May that there was a "100 percent" chance he would remain at the club the following season.

2017–18, 2018–19: Domestic success 
Marquinhos began the 2017–18 season on 29 July, starting as PSG won 2–1 in the 2017 Trophée des Champions at the Grand Stade de Tanger in Morocco. In the team's victorious run in the Coupe de la Ligue, he scored in the 3–2 semi-final win at Rennes on 30 January 2018, but was unused in the 3–0 final win over Monaco as young local Presnel Kimpembe took his place. PSG won all four domestic competitions over the season, and Marquinhos told Le Figaro at the end of the campaign that he would remain at the club.

2019–20: European final 
On 12 August 2020, Marquinhos scored a late equaliser against Atalanta in the Champions League quarter-finals, sparking a late comeback for PSG to win 2–1. On 18 August, Marquinhos scored in a 3–0 win over RB Leipzig in the semi-finals of the competition, which saw PSG reach the Champions League final for the first time in its history. PSG eventually lost out 1–0 to Bayern Munich on 23 August.

2020–21: Club captaincy 
Marquinhos was appointed as PSG's club captain on 15 September 2020, succeeding Thiago Silva in the role. He scored his first goal of the season in a match against Nice five days later. On 2 December, Marquinhos scored the second goal for PSG in a 3–1 win against Manchester United in the UEFA Champions League group stage.

In January 2021, Marquinhos played his 300th PSG game against Marseille, also entering the club's top 10 appearance makers of all time.

International career

Youth and first caps
Marquinhos played every minute of Brazil's campaign at the 2011 South American Under-17 Football Championship, as they won and qualified for that year's World Cup in that category. He was again an undisputed starter except for one match at that tournament, as the team took fourth place in Mexico.

In October 2013, Marquinhos, who is of dual Portuguese and Brazilian nationality, stated that he would be open to representing the Portugal national team. However, later that month, he received his first call-up for Brazil when Luiz Felipe Scolari named his squad for friendly matches against Honduras and Chile to be played that November. He made his debut against Honduras in Miami on 17 November, replacing David Luiz for the last 20 minutes of a 5–0 win.

Marquinhos played for Brazil Under-21 at the 2014 Toulon Tournament, featuring in all five of their matches as the country won the tournament. He scored to put Brazil 3–2 up in their eventual 5–2 win in the final over France.

2016: Olympic gold and Copa América Centenario

After missing the 2014 FIFA World Cup on home soil, Marquinhos returned to the senior side in September 2014 under new manager Dunga. He featured in friendly wins over Colombia and Ecuador in Miami, making his first start against the latter. Marquinhos was included in the Brazilian squad for the 2015 Copa América in Chile, his first major international tournament. He made his competitive debut – and only appearance in the tournament – on 21 June in their final group match at the Estadio Monumental David Arellano, replacing Robinho for the final 14 minutes of a 2–1 win over Venezuela which sent Brazil into the quarter-finals as group winners.

In 2016, Marquinhos was named in the Brazilian squad for the Copa América Centenario in the United States, an "experimental" selection lacking his Paris Saint-Germain defensive partners Thiago Silva and David Luiz. He played in the first two games at centre-back alongside Gil before being replaced by Miranda for the last group game, a 1–0 loss to Peru at Gillette Stadium that eliminated his team. Later that year, he was included in the squad for the team's hosting of the Olympic tournament, and in the semi-final against Honduras in Rio de Janeiro, he scored in an eventual 6–0 win.

2018 World Cup and 2019 Copa América victory
With Silva injured, Marquinhos captained Brazil for the first time on 10 October 2017 in a 3–0 win over Chile at Allianz Parque in his hometown. Brazil had already qualified for the 2018 FIFA World Cup and the result ended the continental champion opponents' hope of qualification. In May 2018 he was named in manager Tite's 23-man squad for the final tournament in Russia, alongside clubmates Silva and Neymar. He scored his first international goal on 11 September, in a 5–0 friendly win over El Salvador.

In May 2019, Marquinhos was included in Brazil's 23-man squad for the 2019 Copa América on home soil. In the semi-finals against Argentina on 2 July, Marquinhos was tasked with marking Lionel Messi while suffering from diarrhoea. He helped Brazil to a 2–0 victory over their rivals; he came off in second half for Miranda. On 7 July, Marquinhos started in Brazil's 3–1 win over Peru in the final at the Maracanã Stadium.

On 9 October 2020, Marquinhos scored his first competitive goal for Brazil, heading the opener of a 5–0 win over Bolivia at Corinthians' ground, in 2022 FIFA World Cup qualification. The following month, he earned his 50th cap in another qualifier against Venezuela.

2021 Copa América and 2022 World Cup
On 14 June 2021, Marquinhos scored Brazil's opener in their first group stage match of the 2021 Copa América, a 3–0 win against Venezuela. On 10 July, he started in his nation's 1–0 defeat to rivals Argentina in the final.

On 7 November 2022, Marquinhos was named in the squad for the 2022 FIFA World Cup. In Brazil's quarter-final against Croatia, Marquinhos was their fourth kicker in the penalty shootout after a 1–1 draw, hitting the goalpost and sealing Brazil's loss.

Style of play

In terms of his playing position, Marquinhos is predominantly deployed as a central defender, but has also been used at right-back and in a central or defensive midfield role. He is noted for his anticipation, pace, and intelligence, as well as his technical skills, composure, passing ability, elegance on the ball, and confidence in possession, which enables him to break down attacks and subsequently play the ball out or start offensive plays from the back.

On signing for Roma, Marquinhos described himself as a quick player, with a good positional sense, who wins back a lot of balls, and who can impose himself on a game due to his ability to start attacking plays from the back. He named Thiago Silva as his role model. In March 2015, Marquinhos told FourFourTwo that he compensated for his average height for a defender by honing his strength and timing, attributes he learnt from PSG assistant manager Claude Makélélé. He praised manager Laurent Blanc, a former defender himself, for encouraging the PSG defenders to attack in set pieces and teaching them the correct positioning in that situation.

Fellow Roma defender Nicolás Burdisso said in August 2012 that Marquinhos was "a little phenomenon. He has speed, heading ability, he knows what to do, he is humble. He is a little Thiago Silva".

In January 2014, Marquinhos was named by British newspaper The Observer as one of the ten most promising young players in Europe. They wrote, "He has the temperament to remain undaunted, the talent to succeed, and could benefit from playing alongside his club team-mate, Thiago Silva, with whom he enjoys a solid understanding at wealthy Paris Saint-Germain."

Personal life
In May 2015, Marquinhos told Le Parisien that he had become engaged to Brazilian singer and reality television contestant Carol Cabrino. He proposed to her underneath the Eiffel Tower. They had a civil wedding in June 2016. Their daughter was born on 1 November 2017, with Cabrino having gone early into labour while watching Marquinhos playing a Champions League match against Anderlecht at the Parc des Princes. Their son was born in December 2019.

During a match between PSG and Nantes on 14 March 2021, Marquinhos' parents were held hostage in a robbery. His teammate Ángel Di María was in a similar situation, with his family being hostage in a robbery as well.

Career statistics

Club

International

Scores and results list Brazil's goal tally first, score column indicates score after each Marquinhos goal.

Honours

Corinthians
Copa Libertadores: 2012

Roma
Coppa Italia runner-up: 2012–13

Paris Saint-Germain
Ligue 1: 2013–14, 2014–15, 2015–16, 2017–18, 2018–19, 2019–20, 2021–22
Coupe de France: 2014–15, 2015–16, 2016–17, 2017–18, 2019–20, 2020–21; runner-up: 2018–19
Coupe de la Ligue: 2013–14, 2014–15, 2015–16, 2016–17, 2017–18, 2019–20
Trophée des Champions: 2014, 2015, 2017, 2018, 2019, 2020, 2022
 UEFA Champions League runner-up: 2019–20

Brazil U17
South American Under-17 Football Championship: 2011

Brazil U21
Toulon Tournament: 2014

Brazil U23
Olympic Gold Medal: 2016

Brazil
Copa América: 2019; runner-up: 2021

Individual
UNFP Ligue 1 Team of the Year: 2017–18, 2018–19, 2020–21, 2021–22
UEFA Champions League Squad of the Season: 2019–20, 2020–21
Copa América Team of the Tournament: 2021

References

External links

 

1994 births
Living people
Footballers from São Paulo
Brazilian footballers
Association football central defenders
Sport Club Corinthians Paulista players
A.S. Roma players
Paris Saint-Germain F.C. players
Campeonato Brasileiro Série A players
Serie A players
Ligue 1 players
Brazil youth international footballers
Brazil under-20 international footballers
Olympic footballers of Brazil
Brazil international footballers
2015 Copa América players
Copa América Centenario players
Footballers at the 2016 Summer Olympics
2018 FIFA World Cup players
2019 Copa América players
2021 Copa América players
2022 FIFA World Cup players
Olympic gold medalists for Brazil
Olympic medalists in football
Medalists at the 2016 Summer Olympics
Copa América-winning players
Copa Libertadores-winning players
Brazilian expatriate footballers
Brazilian expatriate sportspeople in Italy
Brazilian expatriate sportspeople in France
Expatriate footballers in Italy
Expatriate footballers in France